Matej Bagarić (born 16 January 1989 in Zagreb, SR Croatia, SFR Yugoslavia) is a Croatian professional footballer who plays for NK Ponikve. Bagarić also represented Croatia at the under–19 level.

Club career
Bagarić came through youth ranks of Dinamo Zagreb, and on 26 January 2008 he joined the affiliate club Lokomotiva. He helped Lokomotiva win the league title and earn promotion to second tier. During the 2008–09 season, he featured in 24 appearances and bagged three goals for Lokomotiva, who were again promoted to the higher–level league. He remained at Lokomotiva for the 2009–10 season, and featured in the first team until he was sidelined by injuries, which continued into the 2010–11 season. His loan was prolonged until late August 2011, when his contract with Dinamo was mutually terminated and he penned a 5-year deal with NK Lokomotiva.

Ahead of the 2019–20 season, Bagarić joined NK Bistra. In 2020, he joined NK Ponikve.

National team
Bagarić debuted for Croatia under–19 national team on 13 February 2007 in a match against Hungary. He was capped a total of 16 times at under–19 level and scored 4 goals.

Honours
 Lokomotiva
 3. HNL (West) champions: 2007–08

Career statistics

References

External links

1989 births
Living people
Footballers from Zagreb
Association football defenders
Croatian footballers
NK Zagreb players
GNK Dinamo Zagreb players
NK Lokomotiva Zagreb players
NK Inter Zaprešić players
NK Slaven Belupo players
CS Concordia Chiajna players
KF Laçi players
NK Lučko players
NK Hrvatski Dragovoljac players
HNK Segesta players
NK Bistra players
Croatian Football League players
First Football League (Croatia) players
Liga I players
Croatian expatriate footballers
Expatriate footballers in Romania
Croatian expatriate sportspeople in Romania
Expatriate footballers in Albania
Croatian expatriate sportspeople in Albania